Stanislas Ouaro (born 19 January 1975) is a Burkinabé politician and mathematician.

Biography
Stanislas Ouaro was born on 19 January 1975. He graduated with a doctor's degree from University of Ouagadougou in 2001 with his thesis titled Etude de problèmes elliptiques-paraboliques nonlinéaires en une dimension d'espace. Before he joined government, he was the president of  since 2012.

On 31 January 2018, he was appointed the Minister of National Education and Literacy, replacing Jean-Martin Coulibaly. On 19 January 2019, he resigned together with other members of Thieba cabinet. On 24 January, he was appointed the Minister of National Education, Literacy and Promotion of National Languages.

Health
During the 2020 coronavirus outbreak, on 21 March, Ouaro contracted the coronavirus.

References

External links

1975 births
Living people
University of Ouagadougou alumni
Burkinabé mathematicians
Education ministers of Burkina Faso
21st-century Burkinabé people